Morki (Morko) is an urban locality (an urban-type settlement) and the administrative center of Morkinsky District of the Mari El Republic, Russia. As of the 2010 Census, its population was 9,914.

Administrative and municipal status
Within the framework of administrative divisions, Morki serves as the administrative center of Morkinsky District. As an administrative division, the urban-type settlement of Morki, together with twenty-four rural localities, is incorporated within Morkinsky District as Morki Urban-Type Settlement (an administrative division of the district). As a municipal division, Morki Urban-Type Settlement is incorporated within Morkinsky Municipal District as Morki Urban Settlement.

References

Notes

Sources

Urban-type settlements in the Mari El Republic
